Ye Re Ye Re Paisa 2 is a 2019 Indian Marathi language comedy drama film directed by Hemant Dhome and bankrolled by Ameya Vinod Khopkar, Purple Bull Entertainment, Trance VFX Studios Pvt Ltd and Panorama Studios. The film stars Sanjay Narvekar, Anand Ingle, Pushkar Shrotri and Mrinal Kulkarni, Aniket Vishwasrao and Smita Gondkar in supporting roles. It was released on 9 August 2019. A sequel is in the works, as confirmed at the end of the movie and in Bigg Boss Marathi Season 2. The said sequel meaning the film is here on Prime. Its a hilarious comedy. Missing actor's name is Prasad Oak who joins the team of select defaulters of Vidarbha Bank, who have been selected by recovery agent Jaggu (Sanjay Narvekar) against one crore offer bank CEO (Mrinal Kulkarni) gave him. Jaggu is assisted by his brother in law Anand Ingle. The team arrives in London to catch Niraj Shah who has duped the bank for ten thousand crores. Ye re ye re Paisa 2 is the sequel of 2018 comedy drama Ye Re Ye Re Paisa.

Cast
Sanjay Narvekar as Anna
Aniket Vishwasrao as Harsh Patil 
Mrinmayee Godbole as Sara Desai 
Pushkar Shotri as Niraj Shah
Anand Ingle as Pradumna/Tenya 
Mrinal Kulkarni as Janhavi Muzumdar 
Prasad Oak as Inspector Sharad Shinde
Priyadarshan Jadhav as Jango
Rohit KaduDeshmukh as Diamond merchant
Smita Gondkar as Kavya
Mahesh Manjrekar as JK

Release
It was theatrically released on 9 August 2019.

Soundtrack

The soundtrack of the film is composed by Troy - Arif and lyrics are written by Kshitij Patwardhan.
The chorus in song "Un Dos Tres" are by Vivek Naik, Rahul Chitnis, Suchitra Dalvi and Sonal Naik, and Spanish vocals are by Murishka D’cruz and Arif Syed. The song "Ashwini Ye Na" originally sung by Kishore Kumar and Anuradha Paudwal composed by Arun Paudwal on lyrics of Shantaran Nandgaonkar from 1987 film Gammat Jammat under label of T-Series has been recreated.

Critical Reception
Mihir Bhanage of The Times of India wrote "There are loopholes in the story and a lot of cinematic liberty is taken. However, that’s in sync with other films in the genre. If you are looking for meaningful cinema, better avoid this one."

References

External links

Indian comedy-drama films
2019 comedy-drama films
2010s Marathi-language films